KRU was a Malaysian pop boy band formed in 1992. The group comprises three brothers, namely Datuk Norman Abdul Halim, Datuk Yusry Abdul Halim and Edry Abdul Halim'. Apart from revolutionising the Malaysian music scene with their blend of pop, R&B and hip hop, Dato' Norman Abdul Halim heads a successful business empire, KRU Studios, with Dato' Yusry Abdul Halim specialising in film, media content and live events, whilst Edry Abdul Halim is a successful composer/producer.

On 18 April 2018, the group announced that they would disband after 25 years being together after their last concert, Konsert Gergasi KRU 25, held from 4 to 6 May.

Early history
Their interest in musicmaking was sparked when they were very young, when one of their aunts bought Norman a keyboard which also attracted his other brothers. They spent their teen years in London where they were exposed to various genres of music, in contrast to the Malay music scene at that time which was dominated by classic rock and ballads.

They continued to write original songs, but little did they know one of Norman's college mates sent a demo to EMI. The International Label Manager by the name of Calvin Wong (now vice-president at Warner Music Asia Pacific) was very impressed by the song and called the brothers to audition. Thus, KRU was formed on 19 May 1992. KRU (addressed by the initials K.R.U and not "kru") stands for Kumpulan Rap Utama or "Major Rap Group", but it is also the Malay word for "crew", borrowed from English.

In 2000, they formed a virtual band named Tyco, whose members consisted of computer-generated alternate versions of themselves.

They also diversified their ventures into producing large-scale and high budgeted films such as the Cicak Man series, Duyung, Magika and Hikayat Merong Mahawangsa.

Major concerts
1993 :  ReKRUed Rap Tour
1995 : Awas Da' Concert
1997 : KRU Mega Tour (Sponsored by Peter Stuyvesant)
1999 : Jammin the Nation
2002 : Konsert Empayar Krujaan (26 Oktober 2002) - Dataran Merdeka
2012 : Konsert Ulang Tahun Ke-20 - Orange Club, Kuala Lumpur

Discography

Studio albums
 Canggih - 1st Album (1992)
 reKRUed - 2nd Album (1993)
 Awas - First Mini Album (1994)
 Beware: Awas da Soundtrack - Soundtrack Album (1995)
 Ooh! La! La! - 5th Album (1996)
 Krumania - First Compilation  (1997)
 The Way We Jam – First Full English album (1998)
 Formula Luar Biasa 8th Album (1999)
 Tyco - First Animated Album (2000)
 Krujaan - 10th Album (2001)
 Empayar Krujaan V 2.0-Repackaged Album (2002)
 Yusry - First Solo Album (2003)
 Relax - Ballads Compilation (2004)
 KRUnisme (2005)
 10 Di Skala Richter (2006)
 Krunomena - All Full Malay Songs Album (2013)
 Gergasi - Final Compilation & Final Album (2018)

Compilation albums
 Krumania (1997)
 Relax (2004)
 Gergasi (2018)

Solo albums
 Yusry (2003) - performed by Yusry Abdul Halim

Special projects
1997 - "Viva Selangor" special album tribute for Selangor F.C.
1997 - "Everest" for Everest project 
1998 - the "Silat Lagenda" soundtrack album - a collaboration with Sharifah Aini, Zainal Abidin, Amy Search, Ning Baizura, Ella and Sheila Majid
1998 - "Never Let The Spirit Die", the theme song for the 16th Commonwealth Games in Kuala Lumpur
1999 - "Fiesta", official theme song for the Tour De Langkawi
2005 - "Suluhkan Sinar", dedicated to victims of the 2004 tsunami, performed by Artis Bersatu (including Raihan, Anita Sarawak, Ning Baizura, Misha Omar and Erra Fazira)
2011 - "Gemuruh Suara" - theme song for the Malaysian contingent participating in the 26th Southeast Asian Games.
2011 - "Di Manakan Ku Cari Ganti", a reproduced P. Ramlee song for the Tribute to P. Ramlee project (also including acts to the likes of Dayang Nurfaizah, Jaclyn Victor and Ning Baizura)
2015 - "Kuasa Juara" - theme song for the Malaysian contingent in the 28th Southeast Asian Games.

Achievements

1994
Anugerah Bintang Popular – Most Popular TV Entertainer (Male)
1995
Anugerah Industri Muzik (AIM) – Best Engineered Album (Artiste/Producer/Album: KRU/KRU/Awas); Best Pop Album (Artiste/Producer/Album: KRU/KRU/Awas)
Anugerah Bintang Popular – Most Popular Group
1996
Anugerah Industri Muzik (AIM) – Best Group Vocal Performance in an Album (Artiste/Album: KRU/Awas da' Soundtrack)
Anugerah Bintang Popular 1996 – Most Popular Group
EMI Achievement Award – Earning 10× platinum for sales exceeding 1 million
1997
Anugerah Industri Muzik (AIM) – Best Engineered Album (Engineer/Album: Edry/Izan/Jon Gass/Martin Horenburg/Steve Hall/Ooh! La! La!); Album of the Year (Artiste/Producer/Album: KRU/KRU/Ooh! La! La!)
Anugerah Video M 1997 – Best Music Video, Best Performance by an Artiste, Best Editing, Best Photography, Best Art Direction, Best Direction
Malaysian Book of Record (MBOR) – First Artist To Duet With a Departed (Late P.Ramlee – song "Getaran Jiwa"); First Malaysian video clip nominated for the MTV Video Music Award, Fanatik
1998
Anugerah Industri Muzik (AIM) – Best Music Video (Director/Song: Saw Teong Hin/Fanatik)
Anugerah Bintang Popular 1998 – Most Popular Group
1999
Anugerah Industri Muzik (AIM) – Best Music Video (Director/Song: KRU/The Way We Jam); Best Engineered Album(Engineer/Album: Edry Abdul Halim/The Way We Jam); Anugerah Kembara(special jury's award to recognise local acts who have made an impact regionally or internationally)
Anugerah Bintang Popular 1999 – Most Popular Group
2000
NTV7's Most Popular Video Clip – Most Popular Video Clip, Jangan Lafazkan (chosen by public through polls)
Anugerah Planet Muzik (APM) – Best Asian Group
2001
Music Authors' Copyright Protection Bhd (MACP) – Most Popular English Song (The Way We Jam)
Malaysian Book of Records (MBOR) – First Virtual Artiste KRU created Tyco, their virtual alter egos with 3D characters named Tylo, Yiko and Psylo.
2002
Anugerah Industri Muzik (AIM)- Best Nasyid Album (Artiste/Producer/Album: Rabbani/KRU/Intifada)
Malaysian Video Awards 2002 – KRU's video Impak Maksima won SILVER in the Best Music Video category
2003
Anugerah Industri Muzik (AIM) – Best Music Video (Director/Song: Virginia Kennedy/Impak Maksima); Best Nasyid Album (Artiste/Producer/Album: Rabbani/Edry, Archie & Ustaz Sohibul/Qiblat)
Anugerah Juara Lagu (AJL) 18 – Winner of the Pop Rock category for Ezlynn's Hi Hi Bye Bye
2004
Anugerah Bintang Popular 2004 – Most Popular Singer – Male (Yusry)
2005
Anugerah ERA 2005 – Choice Music Video (Terhangat di Pasaran); Choice Vocals – Duo or Group (Terhangat di Pasaran)
2008
 Anugerah Planet Muzik - Anugerah Cipta Planet Muzik
2009
 FFM 23 - Best Film (Magika)
2011
 FFM 24 - Hikayat Merong Mahawangsa
2012
 Shout Award - The Ultimate Shout Award
 The BrandLaureate Grand Master Brand Icon Leadership Award - Norman Abdul Halim
 Anugerah Tokoh Profima (Filem) - Norman Abdul Halim
2013
 Shout Awards - Music Video Award (Semalam Tanpamu - with Stacy)
2014
 MACP Anugerah Komposer Pendapatan Terbanyak (Edry Abd Halim)
 Winner of Best Family Film, Niagara Integrated Film Festival - Ribbit
2015
 MACP Anugerah Komposer Pendapatan Terbanyak (Edry Abd Halim)
IOC Trophy Sport Innovation (Kuasa Juara)
 Festival Filem Malaysia 27 - Best Animation Film (Ribbit - KRU Studios)

KRU Group of Companies

KRU Academy - vocational college specializing in skills related to the Creative Industry
KRU Music - record labels and music publisher
KRU Media
KRU Entertainment
KRU Singapore
Prodigi Lab- digital media laboratory and studio
Hot Jam Cafe
Showbiz Productions
Kartun Studios
Music Unlimited
United Studios

Hit songs composed (performed by other artists)
Red Cyndi (Taiwan Singer) - Hi Hi Bye Bye (Originally sing by Ezlynn)
AZ Yet ft Jaclynn Victor - Magical Moment (OST Ribbit)
Yuki - 亂了 (Aku Siapa Kau Siapa, Originally performed by Elite)
Alex To 妳有罪的心 (Andai Kau Pergi, Original singer: Indigo)
Caliph Buskers - Hanya NamaMu
Sharifah Aini - Takkan Melayu Hilang Di Dunia
Anita Sarawak - Seksis; Ular
Erra Fazira - Ingin Tahu
Ella - Permata Pemotong Permata; ISA
Tiara Jacquelina - Asmaradana (OST Puteri Gunung Ledang)
Anuar Zain - Sedetik Lebih (OST Hikayat Merong Mahawangsa)
Zainal Abidin - Ceritera (OST Silat Lagenda)
Amy Mastura - Satu Dalam Sejuta
Ning Baizura - Bawa Daku Pergi
Rabbani - Pergi Tak Kembali; Satu Kiblat Yang Sama; Apa Yang Kau Tahu; Intifada
Feminin - Kini; Untukmu; Di Mana; Selamat Tinggal Cinta
Imam Muda - Pejuang Agama (Theme song for Imam Muda 2)
Shahir - Kebahagiaan Dalam Perpisahan
Elite - GIG; Trauma; Tamparan Wanita; Manisnya Senyumanmu
Adam - Tak Tahu; Robot
Forteen - Kita 
Adira - Aku Ada Kamu
Mawi & Diana Danielle - Penyembuh Rindu (OST Magika)
Mawi, Akhil Hayy; Imam Muda - HambaMu (Theme Song for Imam Muda)
Tomok - Arjuna
Syura - Gantung
Sofaz - Pencinta Terbaik
Indah & Ewal - Cerita Cinta Kita (OST Pelamin Fantasia)
Melly Goeslow ft Yusry - Di Bius Cinta (OST Cicakman 2)
Slam - Sinar Menunggu; Biarkannya
Indigo - Istimewa; Gadis Misteri
Arip (Winner of Kilauan Emas 4) - Aku Tak Bisa

References

External links
Everynoeconnects.net

Malaysian pop music groups
Malaysian film directors
EMI Records artists
Malaysian hip hop groups
Malaysian contemporary R&B musical groups
Malaysian boy bands